Marija Petrović Cvetković (born 12 October 1988), née Marija Petrović, is a former Serbian professional basketball player.

Basketball career 
Petrović started his basketball career playing with the youth teams of the Actavis Academy from Leskovac. She played one season for the AEL Limassol of the Cyprus Division A. Also, she played for the Student Niš and ŽKK Bor of the First League of Serbia before join Partizan in 2015.

References

External links
Profile at eurobasket.com

1988 births
Living people
Sportspeople from Leskovac
Guards (basketball)
Serbian expatriate basketball people in Cyprus
Serbian women's basketball players
ŽKK Partizan players